The 2003 Grand Prix motorcycle racing season was the 55th F.I.M. Road racing World Championship season. The season consisted of 16 races, beginning with the Japanese motorcycle Grand Prix on 6 April 2003 and ending with the Valencian Community motorcycle Grand Prix on 2 November.

Season summary

Defending champion Valentino Rossi won his 3rd MotoGP championship in 2003, winning 9 races, highlighted by his win at Phillip Island where he was given a 10-second penalty for passing under a yellow flag and he overcame the penalty by winning the race with more than 10 seconds in hand. Rossi had become dissatisfied with his relationship with the Honda Racing Corporation and as the season progressed and HRC tried to get Rossi to sign a new contract, Rossi demurred until finally announcing at the end of the year that he would be leaving Honda. He soon signed with Yamaha and took Jeremy Burgess with him to be his crew chief.

The season was marred by Daijiro Kato being killed at the first round at Suzuka. He lost control of his motorcycle on the approach to the Casio Triangle and hit a barrier at high speed. His heart was restarted by track paramedics, but he did not wake from a coma and died 2 weeks later. Controversy arose because the race was not red-flagged to allow Kato to be removed from the track with maximum care. Suzuka has since been removed from the MotoGP calendar. Teammate Sete Gibernau would inherit Kato's factory-spec RC211V.

MotoGP rookies for 2003 included Nicky Hayden (Rookie of the Year), Troy Bayliss, Marco Melandri and Colin Edwards. A new constructor also arrived: Ducati. After much success in Superbike racing, Ducati returned to the premier-class of GP with their GP3. It made an immediate impression with its raw speed, and they finished the constructor's championship in second place, ahead of Yamaha and behind Honda.

Just like in 1998, Honda motorcycles won 15 (9 for Repsol Honda, 4 for Gresini and 2 for Pons each) of 16 races in the premier MotoGP class season.

2003 Grand Prix season calendar
On 12 July 2002, the FIM confirmed the 2003 pre-calendar. The South African GP was originally scheduled to run as the new season opener before the Japanese GP on this pre-calendar. On 16 October 2002, the FIM confirmed the 2003 calendar. In it, the South African and Japanese Grands Prix were switched around again.

The following Grands Prix were scheduled to take place in 2003:

 †† = Saturday race

Calendar changes
There were no calendar changes for the 2003 season.

Regulation changes
The following changes are made to the regulation for the 2003 season:

Sporting regulations
For this year, the rules will changed regarding the neutralisation of a race. This only applies to the MotoGP class. If the circumstances change in such a significant way due to weather changes, a heavy accident or any other reason, a race may be neutralised either once or multiple times and the following rules will apply:

 A white flag with diagonal red cross (indicating damp conditions) will be shown in a still manner at each marshal post.

 A safety car will enter and make one sighting lap. The subsequent pit lane exit will be closed with red lights and a red flag indicating this.

 Riders can opt to enter the pit lane at the end of their current lap or make one more sighting lap to check the track conditions, then will have to enter the pits.

 All riders who opt to ride one more lap have to catch up to the safety car on track. Any overtaking of the safety car is forbidden.

 At the end of the safety car's run, it will enter the pit lane and the circuit will be closed with indication of the red flags. All riders following the safety car must also enter the pits.

 The safety car will stop ± 50 meters behind the exit of the pit lane.

 While in the pits, all riders are allowed to make changes to their tyres, adjustments to their motorcycles, refuel or change bikes.

 If the race is neutralised before the final lap, a provisional race classification will be published. The provisional classification will consist out of the results taken at the last point where the leader, as well as all other riders on the same lap as the leader, had completed a full lap without the display of any neutralisation flags being waved. Riders who were already in the pit lane before will also be included in the provisional classification. Any rider who did not complete at least 75% of the laps completed by the race leader will not be classified. The race will be resumed if possible following the procedures of article 1.28. 

 If a race is neutralised during the final lap, the following procedure will apply: if at least one rider has completed all scheduled number of laps of the original race, the final classification will be calculated according to article 1.25.1 and the race will not be resumed. If no rider has completed the final number of laps of the original race, the provision of article 1.27.8 will apply and the race will continue based on the standards of article 1.28.

 If a race is neutralised more than once, the provisional race classification for positions and allowance of participation in the resumed start will always be based on the provisional race classification from the last time a race was neutralised.

 In all cases, the provisional race classification must be displayed on the official timekeeping monitors.

In the case of a race restart after neutralisation, the following rules will apply for the MotoGP class only:

 The Race Direction will officially announce when the safety car will leave the pits to resume the race.

 The number of laps which still have to be done will be measured by the scheduled number of laps the original race had and the number of laps of the provisional race classification. If the difference is less than three, the number of laps to go will be three laps.

 If a race is neutralised more than once, the number of laps which still have to be done will be measured by the scheduled number of laps the original race had and the number of completed laps in all the previous parts. If the difference is less than three, the number of laps to go will be three laps.

 Only the riders which are included in the latest provisional race classificial are permitted to resume the race.

 Two minutes before the safety car exits the pits, the pit lane exit will be opened with indication of green lights and flags to allow all riders to bunch up behind the safety car in the order of the provisional race classification.

 Thirty seconds before the safety car exits the pits, all riders should be ready behind the safety car in the order of the provisional race classification.

 The pit lane exit will be closed with an indication of red flags and lights and the safety car will make one lap followed by all the riders upon announcement by the Race Direction. Overtaking the safety car is forbidden and any riders who remain in the pits will have to resume the race from there.

 In all cases, the time to go before the safety car leaves and the pit lane closes, must be shown on a countdown board or clock which is present in the pit lane exit or on the official timekeeping monitors.

 At the end of the safety car's lap, it will enter the pits whilst all riders continue on the circuit.

 The race will be resumed via a rolling start when the riders cross the start/finish line where two green flags will be waved on each side of the track and the green start lights will be turned on. At this time, a time penalty may be given by the Race Direction to any rider:
 -who is not behind the rear wheel of the motorcycle in front of him.
 -who is in a higher position than in the provisional race classification.
 -who is more than three seconds behind the rider in front of him.

 After the last rider in the file has passed the pit lane exit, the green lights will be turned on and the green flag will be waved to allow the riders in the pits to resume the race.

 The final race classification will be created according to the position and the total number of laps of each rider at the time he crossed the start/finish line at the end of the race. The procedures of article 1.23.5. will apply in this case.

Technical regulations
Following Yamaha decided to ditch carburetor fuel feed after 2002 season, all MotoGP motorcycle entrants would began mandatorily utilizing fuel injection for the first time.
 The exposed edge of the exhaust pipe must be rounded to avoid any sharp edges. The last 30mm of the pipe must be horizontal and parallel to the center line of the bike with a tolerance of ±10 degrees.

2003 Grand Prix season results

 †† = Saturday Race

Participants

MotoGP participants

250cc participants

125cc participants

Standings

MotoGP riders' standings
Scoring system
Points were awarded to the top fifteen finishers. A rider had to finish the race to earn points.

 Rounds marked with a light blue background were under wet race conditions or stopped by rain.
 Riders marked with light blue background were eligible for Rookie of the Year awards.

† – Daijiro Kato was fatally injured in an accident during the Japanese Grand Prix.

250cc riders' standings

Scoring system
Points were awarded to the top fifteen finishers. A rider had to finish the race to earn points.

 Rounds marked with a light blue background were under wet race conditions or stopped by rain.
 Riders marked with light blue background were eligible for Rookie of the Year awards.

125cc riders' standings

Scoring system
Points were awarded to the top fifteen finishers. A rider had to finish the race to earn points.

 Rounds marked with a light blue background were under wet race conditions or stopped by rain.
 Riders marked with light blue background were eligible for Rookie of the Year awards.

Constructors' standings
Scoring system
Points were awarded to the top fifteen finishers. A rider had to finish the race to earn points.
 

 Each constructor gets the same number of points as their best placed rider in each race.
 Rounds marked with a light blue background were under wet race conditions or stopped by rain.

MotoGP

250cc

125cc

Teams' standings
 Each team gets the total points scored by their two riders, including replacement riders. In one rider team, only the points scored by that rider will be counted. Wildcard riders do not score points.
 Rounds marked with a light blue background were under wet race conditions or stopped by rain.

MotoGP

References

Sources

Grand Prix motorcycle racing seasons
 
MotoGP racing season